Hubert Roy Evans  is a Welsh civil engineer and academic.

He is a native of Llandysul, in Ceredigion, Wales. A graduate of Swansea University (Wales) he became Professor of Civil and Structural Engineering at Cardiff University, where he spent 26 years of his career.

He won international recognition as a civil engineer, receiving numerous awards (including the George Stephenson Medal in 1980) and became a Fellow of the Royal Academy of Engineering in 1992. Evans was appointed Commander of the Order of the British Empire in 2002, for services to higher  education.

He served as Deputy Principal at Cardiff University for four years before his appointment as the Vice Chancellor of the University of Wales, Bangor in 1995, retiring in 2004. He was a Welsh Supernumerary Fellow of Jesus College, Oxford for the academic year 1998/9.

References

External links
 https://web.archive.org/web/20110608032613/http://www.bangor.ac.uk/news/VCDPost.php.en
 https://web.archive.org/web/20110608020446/http://www.bangor.ac.uk/news/vccbe.php.en

Welsh scholars and academics
Welsh civil engineers
Alumni of Swansea University
Academics of Bangor University
Academics of Cardiff University
Fellows of Jesus College, Oxford
Fellows of the Royal Academy of Engineering
Commanders of the Order of the British Empire
People from Ceredigion
Year of birth missing (living people)
Living people